Keston Bledman, HBM (born 8 March 1988) is a track and field sprint athlete, who competes internationally for Trinidad and Tobago.

On 7 July 2007, at the 2007 Pan American Junior Athletics Championships in São Paulo, Brazil, he upset the Jamaican Yohan Blake in the 100 meters, finishing in 10.32 seconds (−1.1 m/s wind).

Bledman represented Trinidad and Tobago at the 2008 Summer Olympics in Beijing. He competed at the 4 × 100 m relay together with Marc Burns, Aaron Armstrong and Richard Thompson. He was the lead off man. In their qualification heat they placed first in front of Japan, the Netherlands and Brazil. Their time of 38.26 was the fastest of all sixteen teams participating in the first round and they qualified for the final. Armstrong was replaced by Emmanuel Callender for the final race and they sprinted to a time of 38.06 seconds, the second time after the Jamaican team, winning the silver medal. In 2022, Bledman and his teammates received the gold medal due to Jamaica's Nesta Carter testing positive for the prohibited substance methylhexaneamine.

He ran in the first round, but not the final of the men's 4 × 100 m at the 2009 World Championships where Trinidad and Tobago won silver.

On 4 June 2011, Bledman ran 9.93 over 100 m in Clermont, Florida, to become the 78th athlete to cross the 10-second barrier. He won his first national title in June 2012 by beating Richard Thompson over 100 m and ran a personal best time of 9.86 seconds, which is currently tied for the 16th fastest ever.  At the 2011 World Championships, he qualified for the 100 m final as one of the fastest losers in the semi-final.

He was also a member of the relay team that won a silver medal at the 2012 Summer Olympics in London. He was part of the Trinidad and Tobago team 4 × 100 m team that won the bronze at the 2014 Commonwealth Games. He ran in the 100 m and the 4 × 100 m at the 2016 Summer Olympics.

Early career 
His mother lived in the US, and Bledman attributes his athletic success to wanting to do well enough to qualify for the national team and earn a visa. He was recruited by Gunness Persad, who became his coach, at Pleasantville Senior Comprehensive sportsday. His first international competition was the 2005 World Youth Championships, where he won an individual bronze. His athletics idol is Hasely Crawford who won the 100 m at the 1976 Olympics for Trinidad and Tobago.

Personal best

International competitions

1Disqualified in the final

References

External links

1988 births
Living people
Trinidad and Tobago male sprinters
Olympic athletes of Trinidad and Tobago
Athletes (track and field) at the 2008 Summer Olympics
Athletes (track and field) at the 2012 Summer Olympics
Athletes (track and field) at the 2016 Summer Olympics
Olympic silver medalists for Trinidad and Tobago
Commonwealth Games medallists in athletics
Medalists at the 2012 Summer Olympics
Medalists at the 2008 Summer Olympics
Athletes (track and field) at the 2014 Commonwealth Games
Athletes (track and field) at the 2018 Commonwealth Games
World Athletics Championships athletes for Trinidad and Tobago
Athletes (track and field) at the 2015 Pan American Games
Athletes (track and field) at the 2019 Pan American Games
Olympic silver medalists in athletics (track and field)
Commonwealth Games bronze medallists for Trinidad and Tobago
Pan American Games medalists in athletics (track and field)
Pan American Games silver medalists for Trinidad and Tobago
Pan American Games bronze medalists for Trinidad and Tobago
Central American and Caribbean Games gold medalists for Trinidad and Tobago
Competitors at the 2010 Central American and Caribbean Games
Competitors at the 2018 Central American and Caribbean Games
Olympic gold medalists for Trinidad and Tobago
Central American and Caribbean Games medalists in athletics
Medalists at the 2015 Pan American Games
Medalists at the 2019 Pan American Games
Medallists at the 2014 Commonwealth Games